Falsa identidad is an American drama television series created by Perla Farías and written by Sergio Mendoza. Produced by Telemundo Global Studios and Argos Comunicación. The series stars Camila Sodi and Luis Ernesto Franco. It premiered on Telemundo on 11 September 2018 and began airing on Netflix in 2019.

The series was presented during the Telemundo upfront for the 2018–2019 television season, and revolves around two complete strangers who have to assume the identity of a solid marriage to escape their past and escape their enemies.

On 21 January 2019, Telemundo confirmed that the show had been renewed for a second season. The season premiered on 22 September 2020 and concluded on 25 January 2021.

Plot

Season 1 (2018–19) 

Isabel (Camila Sodi) and Diego (Luis Ernesto Franco) are two strangers who must flee from their past to escape their enemies. Diego left his family after his father died and his mother remarried. In an act of rebellion, and to punish what he considers a betrayal of his father's memory, Diego gets involved in a criminal world, selling fuel to Sonora's most powerful drug dealer, Gavino Gaona (Sergio Goyri). Things got complicated when Diego, being the boyfriend of Gavino's daughter, also ends up having an affair with his wife, thus putting a price on his head.

For her part, Isabel marries Porfirio "El Corona" (Marcus Ornellas) at the age of fifteen years old. He was a member of a norteña music group, whose career was just beginning to take off. Over the years, El Corona's career dies, and he becomes a bitter and neurotic jealous man, who physically abuses Isabel for any excuse. Isabel endures the abuse thinking it is best for the children and to keep the family united until one day the violence of El Corona reaches her children: Amanda (Barbie Casillas) and Ricardo (Checo Perezcuadra).

Isabel escapes from her husband's house with her children, and finds refuge in Zoraida (Marcela Manriquez), a maid that works for Eliseo Hidalgo (Manuel Balbi), the mayor of Álamos, Sonora. Diego, who is the mayor's brother, also hides from the narco in the same house. It is there that their paths cross for the first time, and permanently. Eliseo devises a plan to hide Diego outside of Sonora, taking the identity of an American tourist who has just died in Sonora with his wife and son. To complete the farce, Isabel must pretend to be Diego's wife and have Ricardo act as their child.

Although this decision is the opportunity that Isabel was looking for to escape from El Corona, it also means leaving her oldest daughter behind, and trusting a man she has just met. Isabel and Diego begin their new life in Mexico City, at first they are complete opposites, but they learn to trust in each other. El Corona and the narcos do not take long to go after them, the past always finds them. But in the middle of persecution, Isabel and Diego discover a passion and chemistry that they had never experienced before, and there is only one step from here to real love.

Cast

Main 
 Luis Ernesto Franco as Diego Hidalgo / Emiliano Guevara
 Camila Sodi as Isabel / Camila Guevara
 Sergio Goyri as Gavino Gaona (season 1)
 Samadhi Zendejas as Circe Gaona
 Eduardo Yáñez as Don Mateo
 Sonya Smith as Fernanda Orozco
 Alejandro Camacho as Augusto Orozco (season 1)
 Dulce María as Victoria Lamas (season 2, episodes 4–56)
 Azela Robinson as Ramona (recurring, season 1; main, season 2)
 Alexa Martín as Victoria Lamas (season 2, episodes 58–78)

Also main 

 Uriel del Toro as Joselito
 Álvaro Guerrero as Ignacio Salas
 Geraldine Bazán as Marlene (season 1)
 Gabriela Roel as Felipa
 Marcus Ornellas as Porfirio Corona (season 1)
 Gimena Gómez as Nuria
 Pepe Gámez as Deivid
 Vanesa Restrepo as Paloma (season 1)
 Claudia Zepeda as Diana Gutiérrez
 Toño Valdes as Chucho
 Carla Giraldo as Silvia
 Juliette Pardau as Gabriela (season 1)
 Martijn Kuiper as Jim (season 1)
 Rebeca Manríquez as Zoraida
 Pedro Hernández as Piochas (season 1)
 Alejandra Zaid as Lourdes (season 1)
 Hugo Catalán as Eric (season 1)
 Fernando Memije as Ramiro (season 1)
 Carlos Tavera as El Topo (season 1)
 Eduardo Garzón as El Pelos (season 1)
 Carlos Ramírez Ruelas as Maton (season 1)
 Mauricio de Montellano as Brandon (season 1)
 Manuel Balbi as Eliseo Hidalgo (season 1)
 Barbie Casillas as Amanda
 Checo Perezcuadra as Ricardo / Max Guevara
 Jean Paul Leroux as Alex
 Marco de la O as El Buitre (season 2)
 Vanessa Acosta as Juliana Hernández (season 2)
 Rubén Sanz as Father Rafael (season 2)
 David Palacio as El Man (season 2)
 Abril Schreiber as Gabriela (season 2)
 Pascacio López (season 2)
 Ana Jimena Villanueva as Rosa (season 2)
 Victor Olveira as Darwin Herfer (season 2)
 Arnoldo Picazzo as Mauricio (season 2)
 Latin Lover as El Mister (season 2)
 Vicky Araico as Guadalupe Girón (season 2)
 Sebastián Dante as El Cachorro (season 2)
 Miguel Jiménez as Alberto (season 2)
 Otto Sirgo as El Apá (season 2)

Television ratings 
 

| timeslot2         = MonFri 10:00 p.m.
| link2             = #Episodes
| episodes2         = 71
| start2            = 
| end2              = 
| startrating2      = 0.91
| endrating2        = 
| viewers2          = |2}} 
}}

Episodes

Series overview

Season 1 (2018–19)

Season 2 (2020–21)

Awards and nominations

Notes

References

External links 
 

2018 telenovelas
American telenovelas
Telemundo telenovelas
Spanish-language American telenovelas
Spanish-language telenovelas
2018 American television series debuts
2021 American television series endings
Works about Mexican drug cartels